Mind's Eye Theatre is a live action role-playing game (LARP) based on the White Wolf World of Darkness universe and shares the setting with the table-top role-playing game Vampire: The Masquerade, among others.

In early editions of the game, conflicts and skill challenges involving random chance were settled with a "rock, paper, scissors" system often referred to as "throwing chops" or "hand jamming". In the 2005 release and later, this was removed in favor of a random card-draw mechanic. Every player carries a deck of ten playing cards (2-10, plus an Ace), adding skill modifier to their draw, which is used to determine the outcome of an action.

The game possesses rules both for gameplay and player safety. An advantage of the live-action gameplay is the ability to use the real interactions of players to resolve the majority of encounters between player characters and non-player characters.

In 1999, Pyramid magazine named Mind's Eye Theatre (first edition) as one of the Millennium's Best Games.  Editor Scott Haring said "Mind's Eye Theater was the first to take an established pen-and-paper RPG and do the translation to live-action. And it is easily the most successful live-action game, too."

By Night Studios relaunched Changeling: The Dreaming in 2020. Reviews indicated that it contained "fresh ideas" and that it ''is a supernatural enthusiast's dream game".

As of March 2021, By Night Studios launched a free online System Reference Document (SRD) containing the majority of the rules, mechanics, and fiction from their Vampire: The Masquerade line of products.

Publications
 Mind's Eye Theatre: The Masquerade, Mark Rein·Hagen, (1993)
 Mind's Eye Theatre: The Elder's Revenge Playbook, Jennifer Donaldson, John Flournoy, (1995)
 Mind's Eye Theatre: Laws of the Night, Richard E Dansky, Beth Fischi, et al., (1996)
 Mind's Eye Theatre Core Rulebook (July 2005)
 Mind's Eye Theatre: The Requiem (July 2005)
 Mind's Eye Theatre: The Awakening (August 2007)
 Mind's Eye Theater: Vampire The Masquerade (December 2013)
 Mind's Eye Theatre Vampire: The Masquerade Volume II: Issue 1
 Mind's Eye Theatre Vampire: The Masquerade Volume II: Issue 2
 City in the Sand (PDF Only) (July 2009)
Laws of the Night (1997) (formerly Masquerade; based on Vampire: The Masquerade)
Laws of the Wild (formerly Apocalypse; based on Werewolf: The Apocalypse)
Oblivion (based on Wraith: The Oblivion)
Laws of the Hunt (focusing on mortals as characters)
The Long Night (based on Vampire: The Dark Ages)
The Shining Host (based on Changeling: The Dreaming)
Laws of the Wyld West (based on Werewolf: The Wild West)
Laws of Ascension (based on Mage: The Ascension)
Laws of the Reckoning (based on Hunter: The Reckoning)
Laws of Resurrection (based on Mummy: The Resurrection)
Laws of the East (based on Kindred of the East)
Faith and Fire (based on Dark Ages: Vampire)
Vampire by Gaslight (based on Victorian Age: Vampire)
 Mind's Eye Theatre: Changeling: The Dreaming By Night Studios (2020)

References

Live-action role-playing games
World of Darkness
Role-playing games introduced in 1993